Fray José María Vargas Arévalo O.P. (1902–1988) was an Ecuadorian Dominican friar, writer, and historian.

Biography
He was born in Chordeleg, province of Azuay, Ecuador on November 9, 1902.

He became an ordained priest on December 28, 1928. He wrote a biography of Fray Pedro Bedón and one about Fray Domingo de Santo Tomás.

He received Ecuador's National Prize "Premio Eugenio Espejo" in the Culture category in 1984.

He died in Quito on March 25, 1988.

Works
 La Cultura del Quito Colonial 
 Nuestra Señora del Quinche 
 Arte Quiteño Colonial 
 La Misión Científica de los Geodésicos Franceses en Quito 
 La Conquista Espiritual del Imperio de los Incas 
 Ecuador: Monumentos Históricos y Arqueológicos 
 La Conquista Espiritual y Organización de la Iglesia Indiana Durante el Gobierno de Carlos V 
 Gil Ramírez Dávalos: Fundador de Cuenca 
 Don Hernando de Santillán y la Fundación de la Real Audiencia de Quito 
 La Evangelización en el Ecuador

References 

1902 births
1988 deaths
20th-century Ecuadorian historians
Ecuadorian male writers
Ecuadorian Roman Catholic priests
Roman Catholic writers
People from Azuay Province
20th-century Roman Catholic priests